Baked by Melissa is a chain of bakeries founded by Melissa Ben-Ishay in 2008, specializing in miniature cupcakes. As of 2018, Baked by Melissa has 14 locations in the New York City metropolitan area.

History
Initially, the company baked and sold cupcakes through catering companies. The first Baked by Melissa location was the pickup window at Cafe Bari in SoHo, Manhattan, starting on November 27, 2008.

In 2017, the company gave away 150,000 cupcakes in a project called Side With Love; people in the US could send a box of 25 cupcakes free of charge. The initiative was nominated for a Shorty Award for its impact on social media.

In 2018, Baked by Melissa created a special cupcake, which was sold in support of the Make-A-Wish Foundation.

Melissa’s brother Brian Bushell was the CEO of Baked by Melissa for eight years.

References

Bakeries of the United States
2008 establishments in New York City